The Vítězslav Hálek Memorial is an outdoor monument to Vítězslav Hálek, located at the Charles Square in Prague, Czech Republic.

External links

 

Busts in the Czech Republic
Monuments and memorials in Prague
New Town, Prague
Outdoor sculptures in Prague
Sculptures of men in Prague